ITP may refer to:

Companies and organizations 
 Interactive Theorem Proving (conference), an annual international academic conference
 Intertape Polymer Group, a packaging products manufacturer
 Institute for Theoretical Physics (disambiguation)
 Institutes of Technology and Polytechnics, in New Zealand
 Independent Theatre Pakistan, a Pakistani theatre company
 Industria de Turbo Propulsores, a Spanish gas turbine manufacturer
 International Therapeutic Proteins, a company that produces biological therapeutics from polyclonal antibodies
 Information Technology & Politics, an organized section of the American Political Science Association with the journal Journal of Information Technology & Politics
 International Third Position, a UK-based political movement
 Interurban Transit Partnership, operator of a public transport system in Grand Rapids, Michigan, United States
 Islamabad Traffic Police, a traffic police force in Islamabad, Pakistan

Computing and technology 
 In-target probe, a hardware device used in the computer industry to debug processors at the instruction-level
 Interactive Terminal Protocol, an early Packet Assembler/Disassembler protocol for use on X.25 networks
 Isotachophoresis, a separation technique in analytical chemistry

Education 
 Institute of Transpersonal Psychology, a graduate school in Palo Alto, California, United States
 Interactive Telecommunications Program, a graduate degree program at the Tisch School of the Arts at New York University
 Interdisciplinary Telecommunications Program, a graduate degree program at the University of Colorado at Boulder

Other uses 
 Immune thrombocytopenic purpura (also idiopathic thrombocytopenia), a bleeding disorder
 ITP Publishing Group, a magazine publishing company focusing on the Middle East
 Polikarpov ITP, a Soviet aircraft
 Inosine triphosphate